The Chronicle of Moissac (also known as Chronicon Moissiacense) is an anonymous compilation that was discovered in the abbey of Moissac, but is now thought to have been compiled in the Catalan monastery of Ripoll in the end of the tenth century. Like most chronicles, it begins with Adam, but gains increasing interest for historians as it nears its end date of 828. Unfortunately, a folio with the entries covering the years 716–770 is missing. The only surviving manuscript of the Chronicle of Moissac dates from the later 11th century and is now in the French National Library in Paris (Cod. Paris. lat. 4886).

The base text of the chronicle is the Universal Chronicle of 741, itself a continuation of the Major Chronicle of Bede. For his continuation, the compiler seems to have used early annals that had been compiled in southwest Francia, otherwise untraced, which contribute as primary sources for the career of Charlemagne and the military, political and ecclesiastical history of his times. As the Annals of Aniane made use of the same lost source, they are sometimes used to fill in the Chronicle of Moissac for its lost years.

Notes

Sources

Further reading
 Also available from Gallica.
Claszen, David, and Kats, J.M.J.G. ed. and comm., 'Chronicon Moissiacense Maius. A Carolingian world chronicle from Creation until the first years of Louis the Pious', University of Leiden Research MA thesis, 2 vols (2012), https://openaccess.leidenuniv.nl/handle/1887/20005

10th-century history books
Carolingian Latin historical texts
10th-century Latin books
10th-century Latin writers
10th-century French historians